Doug Jones (born May 24, 1960) is an American actor, contortionist, and mime artist. He is best known for portraying non-human creatures, usually via heavy make-up and visual effects. He has most notably collaborated with acclaimed filmmaker Guillermo del Toro, appearing in the films Mimic (1997), Hellboy (2004), Pan's Labyrinth (2006), Hellboy II: The Golden Army (2008), Crimson Peak (2015), and The Shape of Water (2017). 

Jones's other roles include Hocus Pocus (1993) and its sequel (2022), Tank Girl (1995), The Cabinet of Dr. Caligari (2005), Fantastic Four: Rise of the Silver Surfer (2007), Absentia (2011), Ouija: Origin of Evil (2016), and The Bye Bye Man (2017). He has appeared in the science fiction series Falling Skies (2013–15) and del Toro's horror series The Strain (2014–16). Since 2017, he has portrayed Captain Saru in the science fiction series Star Trek: Discovery.

Early life
Jones was born in Indianapolis, the youngest of four brothers, and attended Bishop Chatard High School. He graduated from Ball State University, where he parlayed his background as a mime into portraying the school mascot "Charlie Cardinal."

Career

Jones started his career in the television and movie industry as a 1980s advertising character, "Mac Tonight." He worked as a contortionist, saying, "You'd be surprised how many times that comes into play in commercials. They'll want somebody to hold a box of Tide funny or something. I once squished into a box for a commercial for relaxed fit jeans." In 1994, he appeared in an episode of Unsolved Mysteries as Gordon Page, Jr., a young man with autism who disappeared from a treatment center in 1991. 

Although known mostly for his work under prosthetic makeup, such as the zombie William "Billy" Butcherson in the Walt Disney Pictures Halloween film Hocus Pocus, or the lead spy Morlock in the 2002 remake of the 1960 film The Time Machine, he has also performed without prosthetics in such films as Adaptation, Mystery Men, and Batman Returns, and indie projects such as Stefan Haves' Stalled, AntiKaiser Productions' Three Lives, Phil Donlon's A Series of Small Things, and as Cesare in David Fisher's 2005 remake of the 1920 silent classic The Cabinet of Dr. Caligari.

Jones played Abe Sapien in Hellboy; the voice was performed by an uncredited David Hyde Pierce in the first film, but Jones's voice was used in the sequel. Explaining the challenge of working so often in rubber suits and prosthetics, he notes, "I have to make that a part of my being and my physicality and again, acting is a full-body experience and that's a part of it when you're doing a costumed character." 

In 2005, he worked again with Mexican director Guillermo del Toro, starring as the Faun in del Toro's multiple-Academy Award-winning Spanish-language fantasy/horror project Pan's Labyrinth. He also has a secondary role in the film as the Pale Man, a gruesome creature with a penchant for eating children. Working once more under heavy prosthetics in both roles, he was also required to learn large amounts of dialogue in Spanish, although ultimately his voice was redubbed anyway, by Pablo Adan. That same year also brought success for The Cabinet of Dr. Caligari, the film receiving three awards at the Screamfest Horror Festival in Los Angeles, including the Audience Choice Award. 

In 2006, Jones appeared in the feature films The Benchwarmers and Lady in the Water, and reprised his role as Abe Sapien by voicing the character in the new Hellboy Animated television project, recording two 75-minute animated films.

In February 2007, Jones's likeness was used for Nvidia's "Human Head" tech demo. In June 2007, he appeared in Fantastic Four: Rise of the Silver Surfer as the Silver Surfer, though Laurence Fishburne provided the character's voice. He reprised his role as Abe Sapien in Hellboy II: The Golden Army, once more under the direction of del Toro, for which he provided both the voice and body performance. He played two other roles in the film: the Angel of Death and the Chamberlain, both under heavy prosthetics. In 2009, del Toro announced on BBC Radio that Jones would be playing the monster in his upcoming version of Frankenstein. 

In 2007, Jones was disappointed to learn that his voice part of the Silver Surfer had been dubbed by another actor (Fishburne) when the film was released. Upon inquiry, he determined that studio pressure had been imposed in order to add more "names" to the movie. As Jones gained greater clout in the industry, he eventually was able to add a clause to his contracts ensuring that no English dialogue of his characters would be dubbed. Roles that include other languages may be dubbed, however. This came into play in Pan's Labyrinth – Jones learned enough Spanish to voice his characters. Still, the decision was made to use a native speaker in order to access the language's nuances adequately.

Jones starred as himself in Sockbaby 4, the fourth installment of the Internet martial arts comedy series Sockbaby.

Jones appeared in the French-language film Gainsbourg (Vie héroïque), written and directed by French comic book author Joann Sfar and produced by Universal Europe. Jones played La Gueule ("The Mug"), the grotesque fantasy muse and malicious doppelganger who teases, guides, and accompanies Serge Gainsbourg throughout his life. He was fitted with prosthetics designed and created by the Academy Award-winning Spanish FX shop DDT Efectos Especiales, with whom he had already worked on Pan's Labyrinth; the FX technicians requested specifically that Jones be given the role of the Mug creature, due to his ability to perform (without complaining) with heavy prosthetics and elaborate special effects. As in Pan's Labyrinth, Jones performed his lines phonetically, this time speaking in French; his voice was redubbed by Éric Elmosnino, who also played Gainsbourg. Director Joann Sfar liked Jones's speech patterns so much that he asked Elmosnino to mimic it when he performed the creature's lines. The film was released in France on January 20, 2010.

In January 2010, Jones signed a book deal with Medallion Press to model a nonfiction comedic coffee table book called Mime Very Own Book, co-authored by Adam Mock and Scott Allen Perry and photographed by Eric Curtis. The book was due for publication in December 2011.

Jones plays Dr. Henry Vataber in the web series Universal Dead. In late June 2010, it was announced that Universal Dead would be made into a feature film. He appeared in the independent film The Candy Shop, a "modern fairy tale" shedding light upon child sex trafficking, created by the American film studio Whitestone Pictures. 

Jones played the "Operator," a fictional entity based on the Internet myth known as the "Slender Man," in Always Watching: A Marble Hornets Story a 2014 film adaptation of the popular Marble Hornets YouTube series.

Jones was cast as Commander Saru in Star Trek: Discovery, which premiered September 24, 2017. That same year, Jones reunited with Guillermo del Toro, this time in a romantic lead role, the Amphibian Man (the "asset") in the Academy Award winning The Shape of Water.

In 2022, Jones reprised his role as Billy Butcherson in Hocus Pocus 2.

Personal life
Jones describes himself as a "dyed-in-the-wool Christian from the Midwest", to the point that he was initially apprehensive about his role in Hellboy due to the titular character's demonic nature. 

In 1984, Jones married his college sweetheart, Laurie Pontoni. They relocated to Los Angeles in 1985 to further his acting career.

Filmography

Film

Television

Web series

Video games

Music videos

Awards and nominations

References

External links

 
 2013 interview at Superhero Speak
 Doug Jones: Shapeshifter 2020 interview at Imaginary Worlds

1960 births
Living people
Contortionists
American Christians
American male film actors
American male television actors
American male voice actors
American mimes
Ball State University alumni
Male actors from Indianapolis